Janeé L. Ayers (born October 10, 1981) is an American politician and member of the Democratic Party.  In 2015, Ayers was appointed to Detroit City Council as an at large member after the resignation of Saunteel Jenkins, and elected for the remainder of the term on November 8, 2016. She was reelected to City Council for a full four-year term on November 7, 2017. Ayers was defeated in the November 2021 City Council general election.

Background
Janeé Ayers was born in Detroit, Michigan on October 10, 1981. Her mother Shirlene, is a retired Detroit Public Schools teacher and Detroit American Federation of Teachers (DFT) member. She has four siblings, three of whom are school teachers in the Greater Metro Detroit area.

Ayers grew up in North Rosedale Park on the city's Northwest side and graduated from Renaissance High School. She went on to attend Bowling Green State University and earned her degree in Political Science and Public Policy in 2003.

Before being appointed to city council, Ayers worked for the Detroit Recreation Department and was a high school teacher for Detroit Public Schools, teaching science at Millennium High School until its closing in 2007. While working for the Detroit Recreation Department, she was a member of American Federation of State, County and Municipal Employees (AFSCME). Following her stint with Detroit Public Schools, Ayers began working for MGM Grand Detroit and joined UNITE HERE! Local 24. There she began to focus her attention to the labor community. She was soon elected recording secretary and quickly became the youngest officer on the bargaining team. A few short years later, she was elected Vice President of the Metro Detroit AFL-CIO.

Political career
After the resignation of Saunteel Jenkins, Detroit City Council entered a long appointment process to fill the at large seat. Over 135 Detroit residents applied for the position, including former State representatives, a Wayne County Commissioner and multiple former city council candidates. From this pool, Ayers was nominated by Council President Brenda Jones and Council Member Gabe Leland to advance to a round of 17 candidates who were publicly interviewed.  At the end of a lengthy voting process, Ayers was appointed to City Council on February 17, 2015 by a supermajority vote of 6-2.

In 2016, Ayers ran for confirmation of her seat in a special election. She won the 2016 August primary and then defeated Daniel A Bullock in the November General Election by a margin of 61%-39%. Her total vote count of 100,385 was the highest total in a Michigan municipal election in the previous ten years.

In 2017, Ayers sought reelection to a full 4 year council term. In the August Primary, she defeated a host of challengers to advance to the General Election. That November, Ayers won reelection to her seat by defeating challengers Mary Waters and Beverly Kindle-Walker.

Ayers was defeated in the November 2021 City Council general election.

Detroit City Council
One of Ayers most significant achievements as a Council Member was creating the Returning Citizens Task Force, a program designed to "meet the needs of a large population of Detroit residents who are challenged with successfully reintegrating back into the community from the corrections system. The overarching goal of the task force is to create a community based "one-stop" that will serve as the main resource for returning citizens once they are released."

Committee assignments
In her first term as Council Member, Ayers served on the following City Council committees:
Budget, Finance and Audit (Vice-Chair) 
Public Health, and Safety (Vice-Chair) 
Internal Operations 
Rules 
On January 9, 2018, Council Member Ayers was assigned to serve on the following City Council Committees:
 Budget, Finance and Audit (Chair)
 Public Health and Safety (Vice-Chair)

Electoral history

Awards and other honors
- 2016 Michigan Chronicle Woman of Excellence 

- 2017 Michigan Democratic Party Martin Luther King Jr. Award

References

External links
 Detroit City Council website
 Campaign Website

1981 births
Living people
Detroit City Council members
Bowling Green State University alumni
Renaissance High School alumni
Trade unionists from Michigan
UNITE HERE
African-American city council members in Michigan
Michigan Democrats
African-American women in politics
Women city councillors in Michigan
21st-century American politicians
21st-century American women politicians
American Federation of State, County and Municipal Employees people
African-American trade unionists
21st-century African-American women
20th-century African-American people
20th-century African-American women